Jessica Mager (born 1 June 1988) is a German sports shooter. She competed in the Women's 10 metre air rifle event at the 2012 Summer Olympics.

References

External links
 

1988 births
Living people
German female sport shooters
Olympic shooters of Germany
Shooters at the 2012 Summer Olympics
People from Solingen
Sportspeople from Düsseldorf (region)
21st-century German women